Johan Jansen (born 7 February 1989) is a Dutch professional footballer who plays, as a goalkeeper, for Sparta Nijkerk in the Dutch Derde Divisie.

Career
Born in Terschuur, Jansen made his professional debut during the 2007-08 season for NAC Breda. After playing with Almere City, Jansen moved to GVVV in February 2011.

On 10 December 2021, Sparta Nijkerk announced their signing of Jansen, who would begin playing for them in the 2022-23 season. This was confirmed by his former club, GVVV, a day later.

References

1989 births
Living people
People from Barneveld
Footballers from Gelderland
Dutch footballers
NAC Breda players
Almere City FC players
GVVV players
Sparta Nijkerk players
Eredivisie players
Eerste Divisie players
Tweede Divisie players
Derde Divisie players
Association football goalkeepers